East Shore Road Historic District is a national historic district located at Halesite in Suffolk County, New York.  The district has 21 contributing buildings, one contributing site, and one contributing structure.  The majority of the residences date from 1860 to 1900 and represent one of the few intact collections of largely intact working class dwellings in Huntington.  It also contains three settlement period dwellings, the site of a pottery works, and the Town Park.

It was added to the National Register of Historic Places in 1985.

References

External links
East Shore Road Historic District (Living Places)

National Register of Historic Places in Huntington (town), New York
Historic districts on the National Register of Historic Places in New York (state)
Colonial Revival architecture in New York (state)
Historic districts in Suffolk County, New York